The 1913 Argentine Primera División was the 22nd season of top-flight football in Argentina. Racing won the official AFA tournament also achieving its first title in Primera División, while Estudiantes (LP) won the FAF title.

The AFA season began on April 13 and ended on December (?) while the FAF season began on May 1 and ended on December 21.

Asociación Argentina de Football – Copa Campeonato 

The number of teams was considerably increased (from 6 to 15), adding Ferro Carril Oeste (promoted as División Intermedia champion) and directly promoting Banfield, Boca Juniors, Comercio, Estudiantil Porteño, Ferrocarril Sud, Olivos, Platense and Riachuelo. Olivos and Riachuelo were relegated at the end of the season.

Final playoff

Match details

Federación Argentina de Football
Hispano Argentino and Tigre joined the league.

Notes

References

Argentine Primera División seasons
p
p
1913 in Argentine football
1913 in South American football